Sterling Holiday Resorts Limited (known as Sterling), a leading leisure holiday lifestyle company, incorporated in the year 1986. In 2015, Sterling Holiday Resorts India Limited became a 100% independently managed subsidiary of Thomas Cook India Limited (TCIL) in the back of the former's equity shares being bought in an off-market transaction by Thomas Cook Insurance Services (TCISIL).

Thomas Cook India Limited (TCIL) traded on stock exchange as NSE: THOMASCOOK; BSE: 500413. Sterling currently has 37 resorts in India.

Sterling Holiday Resorts Limited, signed an agreement in October 2015 to acquire Nature Trails Resorts Private Limited – an adventure holiday company that operates resorts at 4 destinations in Maharashtra. It has been reported that the company is looking at expanding to more destinations.

Sterling is affiliated with Resorts Condominium International (RCI) which has 4600 affiliated resorts worldwide and 110 resorts in India. It is also accredited by AIRDA (All India Resorts Development Association).

History
Sterling was established in 1986 in Chennai, India, and opened its first resort, Lake View Kodaikanal (the resort has been recently renamed as Kodai – By The Lake). Sterling Holidays expanded to 11 resorts by the year 1988. In 2010, the company changed its brand name from Sterling Resorts to Sterling Holidays.

The holiday company currently operates 37 resorts in 30 scenic destinations across the country (as of March 2023) and counting.

Resorts 
The resorts in the Sterling destination network are spread across India. Sterling Mantra Haridwar and Sterling Shivalik Chail are their latest addition to Sterling Holidays. Sterling has been delivering great holiday experiences for more than three decades now. Their resort destination network has something to suit every holiday appetite, from majestic hillsides to beachside nirvana to jungle retreats to riverside resorts to spiritual sojourns.

Notable Resorts 
 Sterling Lake Palace - Alleppy
 Sterling House Boat - Alleppy
 Sterling Anaikatti
 Sterling Corbett
 Sterling Darjeeling
 Sterling Gangtok – Orange Village
 Sterling Rudra Gir
 Sterling Goa Varca
 Sterling Guruvayur
 Sterling Kalimpong
 Sterling Kanha
 Sterling Karwar
 Sterling Kodai – Lake
 Sterling Kodai – Valley
 Sterling Kufri
 Sterling Lonavala
 Sterling Madurai
 Sterling Manali
 Sterling Mantra Haridwar
 Sterling Mount Abu
 Sterling Munnar
 Sterling Mussoorie
 Sterling Nainital
 Sterling Ooty – Elk Hill
 Sterling Ooty – Fern Hill
 Sterling Padam Pench
 Sterling Palavelli Godavari
 Sterling Puri
 Sterling Rishikesh
 Sterling Sariska
 Sterling Shivalik Chail
 De Laila HouseBoats Srinagar
 Sterling Thekkady
 Sterling Arunai Anantha Tiruvannamalai
 Sterling Wayanad
 Sterling Yelagiri
 Sterling Yercaud

Timeline
 1986 – The company was incorporated as a Private Limited Company on 22 May and converted into a Public Limited Company on 11 Dec 1989.
 1988 – Sterling Holidays inaugurated the country's first Time Share holiday resort in Kodaikanal on 15 April.
 1990 – Launched Ooty – Elk Hill
 1993 – Launched Ooty – Fern Hill
 1994 – Launched Puri – Golden Sands
 1995 – The company expanded the resort network in Darjeeling, Goa, Manali, etc.
 2006 – Sterling Holiday Resorts India appointed Mr S.Sidharth Shankar as an Additional Director (Non-Executive Director) of the company.
 2009 – Sterling Holiday Resorts India Ltd appointed Mr.Amit Jatia, as Additional Director on the Board of the company.
 2010 – Sterling Holiday Resorts (India) reports net profit of Rs. 0.06 crore in the March 2010 quarter
 2011 – On 4 July, Mr. Ramesh Ramanathan moved to Sterling Holidays as the new Managing Director.
 2015 – Sterling Holiday Resorts Limited became a 100% independently managed subsidiary of Thomas Cook India Limited (TCIL).
 2015 – On 26 October, Sterling Holidays Forays into Adventure Tourism, Acquires Nature Trails – an adventure holiday company.
 2016 – Launched Sterling Agra, Sterling Kufri, Sterling Anaikatti
 2017 – Launched Sterling Goa Varca, Sterling Kanha, Sterling Wayanad
 2018 – Launched Sterling Atharva – Jaipur, Sterling Mount Abu
 2019 – Launched Sterling Guruvayur, Sterling Rajakkad
 2022 – Launched Sterling Pench
 2023 – Launched Sterling Mantra Haridwar
 2023 – Sterling was part of world's largest tourism trade fair - ITB Berlin 2023.
 2023 – Launched Sterling Shivalik Chail

About investors 
In 2009, Bay Capital (formerly Indus Hospitality Fund) invested in Sterling Holiday Resorts, acquiring an 18.80% stake. Again in 2009, India Discovery Fund acquired a 7% stake in the company. Bay Capital and others (including India Discovery Fund, Damani group and Jhunjhunwala group) now holds a total stake of 47.42% in Sterling Holiday Resorts through its funds.

In July 2011, the company announced an Extraordinary General Meeting on 13 August 2011 to seek shareholder approval to raise Rs. 121.5 crore capital through the issuance of equity shares & warrants on a preferential basis to a consortium of investors led by Rakesh Jhunjhunwala and Radhakrishna Damani.

On 7 February 2014, Thomas Cook India Ltd. (TCIL) & Sterling Holiday Resorts Limited announced a merger between the companies.

References

External links
 
 
 
 
 
 
 
  
 
 Sterling Holidays article in Business Today
 
 
 
 * 
 
 
 
 
 

Travel and holiday companies of India
Companies based in Chennai
1985 establishments in Tamil Nadu
Indian companies established in 1986
Companies listed on the National Stock Exchange of India
Companies listed on the Bombay Stock Exchange